The Barcroft–South Fairlington Line, designated as Route 22A, Route 22C, or Route 22F, is a daily bus route operated by the Washington Metropolitan Area Transit Authority between Ballston–MU station of the Orange and Silver lines of the Washington Metro (22A, 22C) or Skyline City (22F) and Pentagon station of the Yellow and Blue lines of the Washington Metro. The 22 Line trips are roughly 20 minutes during peak hours, 30 minutes during off peak, and 60 minutes on weekends. This line provides service to Ballston or Skyline City and the Pentagon Transit Center from the neighborhoods of Arlington County, Fairfax County and Alexandria.

Route description and service

The 22A, 22C, and 22F operate from Four Mile Run Division on various schedules. The 22A only operates during off peak hours and weekends through Pentagon City, while the 22C and 22F only operate during rush hours. The 22C and 22F do not serve the neighborhood of Parkfairfax nor Pentagon City station, although 22F runs on a one way route, mornings to Pentagon Station and afternoons to Skyline City. The 22A and 22C run through the neighborhoods of Buckingham, Alcova Park, Barcroft, and Fairlington between terminals. 22F serves the neighborhoods of Stonegate and Fort Ward, before joining the other lines at Fairlington.

History

The line was formerly known for two lines. It was known as "Walker Chapel–Pentagon Line", from 1979 all the way up to December 29, 2003, and "Pentagon–Army-Navy Drive–Shirley Park Line" for the first Route 22B, from December 29, 2003 all the way up to June 28, 2009. The full former line was renamed the "Barcroft–South Fairlington Line".

Walker Chapel–Pentagon Line

Routes 22A, 22B, 22C, and 22F were the original four routes of the 22 line. Routes 22A and 22B originally served to Seven Corners Transit Center via the Walker Chapel, Williamsburg Boulevard, and East Falls Church station. Some morning westbound trips, and afternoon eastbound trips of the 22B ends at Ballston station. The 22B only operated during peak hours only, while the 22C operates only on middays, following the same route as 22B. Unlike the 22B, the 22C ends at Ballston and does not operate west of the station. Route 22F operated the same way as the 22B, although it ran on a loop around Walker Chapel, leading to stop at Ballston Station twice. The 22F goes to Pentagon Station in morning peak hours, while it goes to Ballston in afternoons.

In 2003, Arlington Transit began to absorb the northern segment of the 22 line, leading to make plans to modify or discontinue the route. On December 29, 2003, it was finalized that WMATA discontinued the 22C and 22F from the line. The 22B was renamed as the "Pentagon–Army-Navy Drive–Shirley Park Line", discontinuing service west of Shirley Park. The 22A become the "Barcroft–South Fairlington Line", discontinuing service west of Ballston station. The remaining route which is on Walker Chapel, Williamsburg Boulevard, and East Falls Church station is operated by Arlington Transit Route 53.

Pentagon–Army-Navy Drive–Shirley Park Line

After the Walker Chapel–Pentagon Line was split into three different lines, WMATA kept the 22B, by serving through Shirley Park, and Army Navy Drive. The route was truncated and terminates at Shirley Park, located at South Meade Street and 28th Street South in Arlington County, near Gunston Middle School. The 22B began its route at Shirley Park, serving through the neighborhood of Avalon Bay to Pentagon Metro. The 22B also serves Pentagon City, but does not serve the Pentagon City Metro. Unlike the 22A, which is on a different line, the 22B only transfers to Route 22A at Pentagon Station. On December 30, 2007, WMATA announced the Saturday Service for route 22B, after the 22A began Saturday Service in 2006. On June 29, 2009, WMATA discontinued the Pentagon–Army-Navy Drive–Shirley Park Line, after Arlington Transit announced Route 87 that will serve the same spots as the 22B. With ART's service changes, the line is renamed as "Pentagon Metro-Army Navy Drive-Shirlington", as route 87 extended to Shirlington.

Service Changes

December 2006 changes

Starting on December 2, 2006, WMATA added Saturday service on the 22A. This change brings more service to Ballston and Shirlington in the weekends. In 2008, Shirlington opened the Shirlington Bus Station (or Shirlington Transit Center), making the 22A being one of the bus routes to serve as a transfer point. This new bus station discontinued the old intersection bus stop which is located at South Quincy Street and 28th Street South (now Campbell Avenue).

June 2012 changes

Starting on June 17, 2012, WMATA added more peak service between the neighborhood of Barcroft and Ballston Station. This additional service leads to the reincarnation of route 22B. The new 22B runs as a loop around the neighborhood of Barcroft via South George Mason Drive, and ends at the intersection of South Four Mile Run Drive, and Columbia Pike, where the 16Y (Columbia Pike–Farragut Square Line) ends.

June 2015 changes

Starting on June 21, 2015, WMATA added Sunday service on the 22A. This route evolved from weekday service to daily service. Alongside with these changes, the 22 line added more service through the neighborhood of Parkfairfax in Alexandria Virginia, and the Alexandria Campus of Northern Virginia Community College. By the addition of this service, it led to the elimination of routes 25A, 25C, 25D, & 25E from the Ballston–Bradlee–Pentagon Line. The service changes also added more service, by bringing back routes 22C & 22F. The 22A reduced service, by operating only on off peak hours and weekends. As a result, the 22A route replaced the 25E route. The new 22C service follows the same route as the 22A, but only operates during peak hours, and does not serve Parkfairfax. As a result, the 22C route replaced the 25A route. The new 22F route is the only route in the line, where it does not serve north of Fairlington. The 22F serves on an hourly peak schedule, morning rush hours to Pentagon Station, and afternoon rush hours to Northern Virginia Community College Alexandria. The 22F does not serve Shirlington Station, where the 25D served, nor Parkfairfax. As a result, the 22F replaced the 25C and 25D.

June 2018 changes

On June 24, 2018, WMATA eliminated Route 22B, leaving 22A, 22C, and 22F the remaining routes of the line. In addition, the 22A began to operate via Pentagon City before heading to Pentagon Station. This brings more bus service to Pentagon City as routes 16G and 16H from the Columbia Pike–Pentagon City Line and Arlington Transit routes 42, 74, 84 and 87 also serves the station. On December 17, 2018, Arlington Transit began to add Route 72 to bring more service between Ballston and Shirlington. ART 72 absorbed the remaining portion of WMATA's route 22B and reinstated service on N. Glebe Rd, north of Old Dominion Drive, which was part of the Walker Chapel–Pentagon Line in the 1980s.

2020 Proposed Changes
During WMATAs 2021 Fiscal Year budget, it was proposed to discontinue route 22A and 22C being replaced by route 22F and ART Route 72. Route 22A was suffering from low ridership and 22C was a redundant route to the 22F and ART Route 72 between Shirlington and Ballston. However WMATA later backed out the elimination of the 22A and the 22C on April 2, 2020.

2020 Changes
Beginning on June 28, 2020, in response to the COVID-19 pandemic, route 22A will be shorten to operate between Pentagon station and Shirlington Transit Center only. Service will not operate between the transit center and Ballston–MU Station during the weekdays. The route also would end at 6:30 PM with no service between 11:00 AM and 1:30 PM. The full route will resume service when Metro moves into its managed re-entry phase. 

Shortly after these changes, Arlington Transit announced that Route 72 will provide service on June 29, 2020 after the service cuts of the 22A. ART 72 will operate on a modified weekday schedule, with buses running every 30 minutes. While the 22A will only operate during restricted hours and on a short intervals, ART 72 completes the route where the 22A won't operate until Metro moves into its re-entry phase.

WMATA announced to restore the line, especially routes 22A and 22F, on August 23, 2020 as part of the Metro's COVID-19 Recovery Plan. These changes brings back service on the full 22A route, which was previously truncated to operate between Pentagon station and Shirlington Transit Center via Parkfairfax and Fairington, and the 22F to serve the city of Alexandria. Route 22C would be the only route on the line that is not returning in service due to response of the COVID-19 pandemic.

September 2020 proposed changes 
On September 10, 2020 as part of its FY2022 proposed budget, WMATA proposed to reduce frequency on routes 22A, 22C, and 22F service in order to reduce costs and low federal funds. However, many WMATA budget proposals planned that all 22A and 22C service was to be taken over by Arlington Transit.

Later on September 26, 2020, WMATA proposed to reduce the frequency of routes 22A and 22F and fully eliminating route 22C. Route 22C has not operated since March 13, 2020 due to Metro's response to the COVID-19 pandemic. Route 22F did not operate between March 16 and August 21, 2020.

References 

2003 establishments in Virginia
Transport infrastructure completed in 2003
22A